The President of the General Council of French Guiana (French: Présidents du conseil général de la Guyane) presides over the nineteen seat General Council of French Guiana.

List of presidents of the General Council

References 

 
Politics of French Guiana
French Guiana